The Tank Medium No. 2 Experimental Vehicle FV4202 also known as the 40-ton Centurion was a technology test bed developed by British company Leyland Motors between 1955 and 1956. It was used to develop various concepts later used in the Chieftain main battle tank.

History
The FV4202 was built by Leyland Motors as a research vehicle for the FVRDE to test the conceptual layout of the proposed
FV4201 Chieftain main battle tank. 
Three vehicles were built between 1955 and 1956. The weight of FV4202 was nearer 42 tons as the cast turrets were usually too heavy due to the fact that the manufacturers of the turret castings were paid by weight rather than per item.
One vehicle is preserved at the Bovington Tank Museum and another one has been 
employed as a recovery training aid at SEME Bordon.

Design
The FV4202 test bed was built from readily available Centurion parts, such as the suspensions, smoke grenade dischargers, armament, hatches, cupola, sights and turret drive.
It featured a reclined driver position, allowing the use of a well-sloped glacis plate and the "mantletless" cast turret was built, with an internal gun  mantlet.

Having a shorter hull than the Centurion, the FV4202 only had five road wheels per side. The FV4202 was also lower than the Centurion due to the use of 28 inches-diameter road wheels (31 inches for the Centurion). The tracks were a narrower variant of the ones used on the early Centurion marks.

The FV4202 is powered by the Rolls-Royce Meteorite V8 petrol engine which was, in essence, two-thirds of a V12 Rolls-Royce Meteor.
The Meteorite has a 18.01 litres (1,099 cu in) capacity and deliver 520 bhp (393 kW) at 2,700 rpm. 
The engine was coupled to a Merritt-Brown V52 gearbox originally developed for the Vickers Medium Cruiser Tank Mk. I.

Appearance in video games
The FV4202 appears in World of Tanks, World Of Tanks Blitz, War Thunder video games,

See also 
FV4201 Chieftain
Centurion (tank)
Conqueror (tank)

References

External links 
 
 

Main battle tanks of the United Kingdom
Cold War tanks of the United Kingdom
Main battle tanks of the Cold War